Victor Lustig (January 4, 1890 – March 11, 1947) was a highly skilled con artist from Austria-Hungary, who undertook a criminal career that involved conducting scams across Europe and the United States during the early 20th century. Lustig is widely regarded as one of the most notorious con artists of his time, and is infamous for being "the man who sold the Eiffel Tower twice" and for conducting the "Rumanian Box" scam.

Early life
Lustig was born in Hostinné, Bohemia, Austria-Hungary. He was exceptionally gifted at learning throughout his youth, but also proved to be a source of trouble. At the age of 19, while taking a break from his studies in Paris, Lustig took to gambling. During this time he received a scar to the left side of his face from the jealous boyfriend of a woman he consorted with. Upon leaving school, Lustig applied both his education and his fluency in several languages to embark on a life of crime, eventually focusing on conducting a variety of scams and cons that provided him with property and money, and which transformed him into a professional con man.

Many of Lustig's initial cons were committed on ocean liners sailing between the Atlantic ports of France and New York City; amongst the schemes he pulled on rich travellers included one in which he posed as a musical producer who sought investment in a non-existent Broadway production. When the services of Trans-Atlantic liners were suspended in the wake of World War I, Lustig found himself in search of new territory to make an income from, and opted to travel to the United States. By this time, he began to earn a level of infamy amongst various law enforcement agencies for the scams he committed, including one he conducted in 1922 in which he conned a bank into giving him money for a portion of bonds he was offering for a repossessed property, only to use sleight of hand to escape with both the money and the bonds.

"Eiffel Tower" scam
In 1925, Lustig traveled back to France. While staying in Paris, he chanced upon a newspaper article discussing the problems faced with maintaining the Eiffel Tower, which gave him inspiration for a new con. At the time, the monument had begun to fall into disrepair, and the city was finding it increasingly expensive to maintain and repaint it. Part of the article made a passing comment that overall public opinion on the monument would move towards calls for its removal, which was the key to convincing Lustig that using it as part of his next con would be lucrative. After researching what he needed to help him utilize the information from the article, Lustig set to work preparing the scam, which included hiring a forger to produce fake government stationery for him.

Once he was ready, Lustig invited a small group of scrap metal dealers to a confidential meeting at an expensive hotel, whereupon he identified himself to them as the Deputy Director-General of the Ministère de Postes et Télégraphes (Ministry of Posts and Telegraphs). In the meeting, he convinced the men that the upkeep of the Eiffel Tower was becoming too much for Paris and that the French government wished to sell it for scrap, but that because such a deal would be controversial and likely spark public outcry, nothing could be disclosed until all the details were thought out. Lustig revealed that he was in charge of selecting the dealer who would receive ownership of the structure, claiming that the group had been selected carefully because of their reputations as "honest businessmen". His speech included genuine insight about the monument's place in the city and how it did not fit in with the city's other great monuments like the Gothic cathedrals or the Arc de Triomphe.

During his time with the dealers, Lustig kept watch on who would be the most likely to fall for his scam and found his mark in André Poisson—an insecure man who wished to rise up amongst the inner circles of the Parisian business community. As Poisson showed the keenest interest in purchasing the monument, Lustig decided to focus on him once the dealers sent their bids to him. Arranging a private meeting with Poisson, Lustig convinced him that he was a corrupt official, claiming that his government position did not give him a generous salary for the lifestyle he wished to enjoy. Believing the sale of the Eiffel Tower would secure him a place amongst the top businessmen, Poisson agreed to pay a large bribe to secure ownership of the Eiffel Tower. However, once Lustig received his bribe and the funds for the monument's "sale" (around 70,000 francs), he soon fled to Austria.

Lustig suspected that when Poisson found out he had been conned, he would be too ashamed and embarrassed to inform the French police of what he had been caught up in, yet despite this belief, he maintained a check on newspapers while in Austria. His suspicions soon proved to be correct when he could find no reference of his con within their pages, and thus he decided to return to Paris later that year to pull off the scheme once more. However, when Lustig attempted to con another group of dealers and had managed to find a mark among them willing to buy the Eiffel Tower, the police were informed about the scam and he fled to the U.S. to evade arrest.

"Rumanian Box" scam
One of Lustig's most notable scams involved selling unsuspecting marks a box that he claimed was a machine that could duplicate any currency bills that were inserted into it, with the only catch being that the device needed six hours to print an identical copy. Referred to as the "money box" or "Rumanian Box", the scam involved a specially designed mahogany box, roughly the size of a steamer trunk. The box's design featured two small slots designed to take in bills and the paper to "print" the duplicate on, and a compartment containing a false arrangement of levers and mechanisms that had to be "operated" to make the duplicates.

In order to convince the mark it truly worked, Lustig would ask them to give him a specific denomination of bill (e.g. $100), insert it into his device along with the paper, and then wait with them until the duplicate was made. When it had, Lustig would take the mark with him to a bank to authenticate the note. In reality, Lustig had concealed a genuine note within the device; the choice of the denomination was influenced by what he put into the box beforehand. Once the mark was convinced, Lustig would refuse to sell them the box until they offered him a high price for it. Before it was sold, Lustig would pack the box with additional genuine notes, to buy him time to make a clean escape, before his mark realized they had been conned.

One of Lustig's most infamous uses of the device was upon a Texas sheriff, whom he convinced to buy it for thousands of dollars. Upon realizing he had been tricked, the sheriff pursued Lustig to Chicago. Upon meeting him again, the sheriff was conned into believing that he was not operating the device correctly, and was handed a large sum of cash as compensation, unaware that the money was counterfeit. This counterfeiting would eventually lead to Lustig's arrest by American law enforcement officers.

Later years, capture, and death
When the Great Depression hit, Lustig concocted a risky scam aimed at Al Capone, knowing that he faced certain death if his mark realized he was being conned. For Lustig, the scam was not a straight-out con, but one designed to get his target to part with a relatively small amount of cash. Lustig asked Capone to invest $50,000 in a crooked scheme, then kept the money given to him in a safe deposit box for two months before returning it, claiming the deal had fallen through. Capone got the impression that he was dealing with an honest man. At this point, Lustig told Capone that the failure of the deal meant he had lost all means of supporting himself. He then convinced Capone to give him $5,000 ($1,000, according to other sources) to "tide him over", as Lustig had originally planned.

In 1930, Lustig went into a partnership with two men from Nebraska—pharmacist William Watts and chemist Tom Shaw—to conduct a large scale counterfeiting operation. Watts and Shaw engraved the plates that would be used to print  the counterfeit dollar bills, while Lustig organised a ring of couriers to distribute the forgeries, ensuring that they were kept in the dark regarding the production of the counterfeits. The operation managed to inject thousands of dollars of counterfeit money (nicknamed "Lustig money") to the U.S. economy each month for the next five years, though the increasing amount entering circulation eventually drew the attention of federal agents.

When Lustig's mistress, Billy May, learned that he was betraying her for a younger woman, she decided to take revenge and placed an anonymous phone call to the federal authorities. On 10 May 1935, Lustig was arrested in New York and charged with counterfeiting. Although he openly admitted to his partners' involvement in the operation, he himself feigned ignorance in the matter. However, Lustig's refusal to disclose information on a key found in his possession proved to be his undoing, as it was later found to open a locker in the Times Square subway station containing $51,000 in counterfeit bills and the plates with which they had been printed.

The day before his trial, Lustig managed to escape from the Federal House of Detention in New York City by faking illness and using a specially made rope to climb out of the building, but he was recaptured 27 days later in Pittsburgh. Lustig pleaded guilty at his trial and was sentenced to fifteen years in prison on Alcatraz Island, California for his original charge, with a further five years for his prison escape. On 9 March 1947, Lustig contracted pneumonia and died two days later at the Medical Center for Federal Prisoners in Springfield, Missouri. On his death certificate his occupation was listed as apprentice salesman.

Ten Commandments
A set of instructions known as the "Ten Commandments for Con Men" has been attributed to Lustig:

 Be a patient listener (it is this, not fast talking, that gets a con man his coups). 
 Never look bored. 
 Wait for the other person to reveal any political opinions, then agree with them. 
 Let the other person reveal religious views, then have the same ones. 
 Hint at sex talk, but don't follow it up unless the other person shows a strong interest. 
 Never discuss illness, unless some special concern is shown. 
 Never pry into a person's personal circumstances (they'll tell you all eventually). 
 Never boast – just let your importance be quietly obvious. 
 Never be untidy. 
 Never get drunk.

See also
Charles Ponzi
Arthur Nadel
Bernie Madoff
Natwarlal
Sergei Mavrodi

References

External links
 Listen to an episode from radio show about Victor Lustig

1890 births
1947 deaths
People from Hostinné
People from the Kingdom of Bohemia
German Bohemian people
Czech fraudsters
20th-century Czech criminals
Confidence tricksters
Eiffel Tower
Deaths from pneumonia in Missouri
Prisoners who died in United States federal government detention